Leeds Girls' High School (LGHS) was an independent, selective, fee-paying school for girls aged 3–18 founded in 1876 in Headingley, Leeds, West Yorkshire, England. It merged with Leeds Grammar School in 2005 to form The Grammar School at Leeds.

History

LGHS was founded in 1876, at a time when female education was limited but expanding. Frances Lupton and other members of the Ladies’ Honorary Council of the Yorkshire Board of Education decided that campaigning for access to the universities was of little use without better all-round education for girls, equivalent to what boys received at traditional academic grammar school. Established interests prevented the use of existing charitable funds, so Lupton and her colleagues created a new way forward: a joint stock company.

The school motto was Age Quod Agis, which means "do what you do". While seemingly tautological at first glance, it is in fact a corruption of the Biblical exhortation, "whatsoever thy turn thy hand to, do it with all thy might". The pupils were divided into four houses, named after the four patron saints of the United Kingdom: Andrew, David, George and Patrick. Girls were placed into the houses that their families had been in before them. There were various house competitions throughout the year, mainly sports and arts orientated, the main one being the house music competition during the spring term.

The school had three sections situated in the western suburbs of Headingley:
Infant School (Rose Court): 3- to 7-year-olds
Junior School (Ford House): 7- to 11-year-olds
Senior School: 11- to 18-year-olds

The Infant School (Rose Court) was situated on the large Senior School site on Headingley Lane, while the Junior School (Ford House) operated  down the road in a converted mansion house. The Senior School building was built in the early 1900s, and efforts are currently being made to have the building listed. The fine oak wood panelling in the Assembly Hall detailed where Old Girls went to university on completion of their education at LGHS. The furniture within the Senior School Library was designed by Robert Thompson (The Mouseman), but was sold when the school moved to Alwoodley Gates (the Leeds Grammar School site).

In 2004 LGHS was the highest performing school within the Leeds LEA area, achieving top results at both GCSE and A Level.

Merger with Leeds Grammar School
In 2005 LGHS merged with Leeds Grammar School to form the Grammar School at Leeds (GSAL). The merged school administration took over LGHS in August 2005, however the schools did not physically merge until September 2008. At that time the Junior School (ages 7–11) and Senior School (ages 11–18) moved to Alwoodley Gates. Classes for girls and boys between the ages of 11 and 16 remain segregated, but all extracurricular activities are mixed. The Infant School moved to the Ford House building next to a new nursery school, currently operating as GSAL'S Rose Court Nursery and Pre-Prep.

The school building was used as a filming location for the fictional St Matthews' Hospital in the new ITV medical drama Monroe, which was scheduled for broadcast in 2011.

Headmistresses

Notable former pupils

Laura Ashe – historian of medieval literature
Judith Blake, Baroness Blake of Leeds – former Leader of Leeds City Council 
Lucy Frazer – UK government minister
Catherine Hughes – former civil servant and Principal of Somerville College, Oxford
Esther Killick – physiologist
Mary Kitson Clark – archaeologist and independent scholar
Sally Mackereth – architect
Pauline Neville-Jones, Baroness Neville-Jones – former civil servant and UK government minister
Valerie Pitts, Lady Solti – former BBC announcer and widow of musician Sir Georg Solti
Marilyn Stowe – divorce lawyer and campaigner for family law reform

See also
Listed buildings in Leeds (Headingley Ward)

References

External links
 Grammar School at Leeds

1876 establishments in England
2008 disestablishments in England
Defunct schools in Leeds
Educational institutions established in 1876
Educational institutions disestablished in 2008
Girls' schools in West Yorkshire